Jun Tsushima (born 1966) is a Japanese politician. He is affiliated with Liberal Democratic Party. He is member of House of Representatives of Japan from Aomori 1st district since December 16, 2012. He previously served as Vice-Minister of Land, Transport, Infrastructure and Tourism and also served as Vice-Minister of Cabinet Office in Third Abe Cabinet.

Jun's grandfather Osamu Dazai was a novelist and his father Yuji Tsushima was the member of House of Representatives (Japan), Minister of Health and Welfare and member of Liberal Democratic Party. His aunt Yūko Tsushima was a novelist like her father. His cousin Kyōichi Tsushima was a member of Democratic Party and member of House of Representatives of Japan from Tohoku Proportional District from 2009 to 2012

References

1966 births
Liberal Democratic Party (Japan) politicians
People from Aomori Prefecture
Gakushuin University alumni
Members of the House of Representatives (Japan)
Living people
20th-century Japanese people
21st-century Japanese politicians